Official Information Act may refer to:

Official Information Act 1982 in New Zealand
Official Information Act 2008 in the Cook Islands